Latakia Governorate, also transliterated as Ladhakia Governorate, ( / ALA-LC: Muḥāfaẓat al-Lādhiqīyah) is one of the 14 governorates of Syria. It is situated in western Syria, bordering Turkey's Hatay Province to the north, Idlib and Hama Governorates to the east, Tartus Governorate to the south, and the Mediterranean Sea to the west. The governorate has a population of 1,008,000 (2011 estimate).

History 
The governorate was historically part of the Alawite State, which existed from 1920–1936.

Tartus governorate was formerly included as part of Latakia, before being split off circa 1972.

The region has been relatively peaceful during the Syrian civil war, being a generally pro-Assad region that had largely remained under government control. The Free Syrian Army attacked Al-Haffah in 2012, and unsuccessfully attempted to wrest control of the province in 2014, 2015 and 2016. In 2016 the Islamic State conducted a bomb attack on Jableh, resulting in many deaths.

Archaeological sites
 Citadel of Salah Ed-Din - Crusader castle
 Paltus - Phoenician city
 Ugarit - Bronze Age site

Geography 

The Latakia Governorate comprises about half of Syria's Mediterranean coastline. The western part of the governorate consists mainly of coastal plains, with the inland eastern parts being mountainous, with the Syrian Coastal Mountain Range (Nusayriyah Mountains) running north to south. Its highest peak, Nabi Yunis, is 1,562 meters (5,125 ft) tall with the average elevation only about 1,200 meters. The western areas of the governorate catch moisture-laden winds from the Mediterranean Sea and are thus more fertile and more heavily populated than the eastern slopes.

The Orontes River flows north alongside the range on its eastern verge in the Al-Ghab Plain, a  longitudinal trench, and then around the northern edge of the range to flow into the Mediterranean. Another important river is Nahr al-Kabir al-Shamali, a river running from the Turkish border and to the southwest to flow in the Mediterranean, with the 16 Tishreen dam, one of the most important in the region, being constructed for power generation, storage of rain and river water, and the creation of Mashqita Lake.

Cities
Latakia is the regional capital; other major settlements include Al-Haffah, Ibn Hani, Jableh, Kessab, Manjila, Qaranjah, Qardaha and Salma.

The following cities are the administrative centres of the districts in Latakia Governorate (Population based on 2004 official census):

Districts 

The governorate is divided into four districts (manatiq). The districts are further divided into 22 sub-districts (nawahi):

 Latakia District (7 sub-districts)
 Latakia Subdistrict
 Al-Bahluliyah Subdistrict
 Rabia Subdistrict
 Ayn al-Baydah Subdistrict
 Qastal Ma'af Subdistrict
 Kessab Subdistrict
 Hanadi Subdistrict
 Al-Haffah District (5 sub-districts)
 Al-Haffah Subdistrict
 Slinfah Subdistrict
 Ayn al-Tineh Subdistrict
 Kinsabba Subdistrict
 Muzayraa Subdistrict

 Jableh District (6 sub-districts)
 Jableh Subdistrict
 Ayn al-Sharqiyah Subdistrict
 Al-Qutailibiyah Subdistrict
 Ayn Shiqaq Subdistrict
 Daliyah Subdistrict
 Beit Yashout Subdistrict
 Qardaha District (4 sub-districts)
 Qardaha Subdistrict
 Harf al-Musaytirah Subdistrict
 Al-Fakhurah Subdistrict
 Jawbat Burghal Subdistrict

Climate

Economy

The governorate is located on the Mediterranean Sea, which gave it great economic importance, with the capital of the governorate, Latakia serving as Syria's main port. Its port was established on 12 February 1950.

Its imported cargo includes clothing, construction materials, vehicles, furniture, minerals, tobacco, cotton, and food supplies such as lintels, onions, wheat, barley, dates, grains and figs; in 2008, the port handled about 8 million tons of cargo.

The governorate is also a popular domestic tourist destination, with the Cote d'Azur B=beach of Latakia being Syria's premier coastal resort, offering water skiing, jet skiing, and windsurfing. The latter hotel has 274 rooms and is the only international hotel in the city. Latakia is also host to numerous designer-label stores, notably on 8 Azar Street, and the heart of the city's shopping area is the series of blocks enclosed by 8 Azar Street, Yarmouk Street, and Saad Zaghloul Street in the city centre. Cinemas in Latakia include Ugarit Cinema, al-Kindi, and a smaller theater off al-Moutanabbi Street.

Demographics

As per the 2004 Syrian census the population was 879,550. A 2011 UNOCHA estimate put the population at 1,008,000, though this has likely changed since the start of the war.

The majority at 63% are Alawites, followed by 26% Sunni Muslim, 6% Christian, 5% Shi'ite Muslim and 0.2% Ismaili.

Languages
The primary languages of the province are Arabic, Kurdish, Armenian and Turkish (Syrian Turkmen dialects). Arabic is spoken in all district centres of the governorate and most, if not all towns and villages surrounding them, with the North Levantine dialect mostly used. An exception is Kessab, a historically Armenian-populated town where Armenian is the primary language in it and the surrounding villages such as Sev Aghpyur, Esguran and Duzaghaj, and the Turkmen Mountain where Turcoman is spoken primarily, though many Turkmen have fled the area since the start of the civil war.

Gallery

References

External links 

 
Governorates of Syria